James Caleb Boggs (May 15, 1909 – March 26, 1993) was an American lawyer and politician from Claymont in New Castle County, Delaware. A liberal Republican, he was commonly known by his middle name, Caleb, frequently shortened to Cale.

He was a veteran of World War II, and a member of the Republican Party, who served three terms as U.S. Representative from Delaware, two terms as Governor of Delaware, and two terms as U.S. Senator from Delaware. He ran for re-election in 1972, but was defeated by 3,162 votes by then-New Castle County Councilman and future US Vice President and President Joe Biden.

Early life and education
Boggs was born on May 15, 1909, at Cheswold, Delaware, the son of Edgar Jefferson and Lettie Vaughn Boggs. He married Elizabeth Muir and had two children, Cale, Jr. and Marilu. They were members of the Methodist Church.

He graduated from the University of Delaware in 1931 and from Georgetown Law School in 1937.

Career 
In 1938, he was admitted to the Delaware State Bar Association and began the practice of law at Dover, Delaware.

During World War II, he served in the US Army with the 6th Armored Division fighting in Normandy, the Rhineland, the Ardennes, and central Europe. He earned five Campaign Stars, the Legion of Merit, the Bronze Star Medal with Oak Leaf Cluster, and the Croix de Guerre with palm from France.

U.S. House of Representatives
Boggs was appointed Associate Judge of the Family Court of New Castle County in 1946. He was elected to the U.S. House of Representatives in 1946, defeating incumbent Democratic U.S. Representative Philip A. Traynor. He won the election a total of three times, also defeating Democrats J. Carl McGuigan in 1948, and Henry M. Winchester in 1950. Boggs served in the U.S. House from January 3, 1947, to January 3, 1953.

Governor of Delaware

Boggs was elected Governor of Delaware in 1952, defeating incumbent Democratic Governor Elbert N. Carvel, and won a second term in 1956, defeating Democrat J. H. Tyler McConnell. He served as governor from January 20, 1953, to December 30, 1960, when he resigned because of his upcoming U.S. Senate term. On April 2, 1958, he signed the bill that ended capital punishment in Delaware.

U.S. Senate

Boggs was elected to the U.S. Senate in 1960, narrowly defeating incumbent Democratic U.S. Senator J. Allen Frear Jr. by 1.4 percentage points, and becoming the only Republican to defeat an incumbent Democratic U.S. Senator that year. He was again elected to the U.S. Senate in 1966, defeating Democrat James M. Tunnell Jr., son of the former U.S. Senator. He served two terms from January 3, 1961, to January 3, 1973. Boggs voted in favor of the Civil Rights Acts of 1964 and 1968, as well as the 24th Amendment to the U.S. Constitution, the Voting Rights Act of 1965, and the confirmation of Thurgood Marshall to the U.S. Supreme Court.

Boggs lost his bid for a third term in 1972 to the future 47th Vice President and 46th President, Democrat Joe Biden, then a New Castle County councilman. Boggs was a reluctant candidate that year, being persuaded to run only to help avoid a divisive primary election. Biden waged an energetic campaign, questioning Boggs's age and ability, and went on to defeat Boggs by approximately 1.4 percentage points. In his last years, Boggs lived in Wilmington, Delaware, where he continued the practice of law.

Death and legacy
Boggs died at Wilmington and is buried in the Old Presbyterian Cemetery in Dover, on the grounds of the Delaware State Museum. The J. Caleb Boggs Federal Building at 844 King Street in Wilmington, Delaware is named for him.

Among the many tributes given by his fellow senators was one from U.S. Senator Robert Byrd of West Virginia:

Elections

References

Bibliography

Images
Hall of Governors Portrait Gallery; Portrait courtesy of Historical and Cultural Affairs, Dover.

External links
Biographical Directory of the Governors of the United States
Biographical Directory of the United States Congress 
Delaware's Governors 
Find a Grave
The Political Graveyard 

|-

|-

|-

|-

|-

1909 births
1993 deaths
20th-century American lawyers
20th-century American politicians
United States Army personnel of World War II
American United Methodists
Burials in Dover, Delaware
Delaware lawyers
Georgetown University Law Center alumni
Republican Party governors of Delaware
Military personnel from Delaware
People from Claymont, Delaware
People from Kent County, Delaware
Recipients of the Legion of Merit
Republican Party members of the United States House of Representatives from Delaware
Republican Party United States senators from Delaware
University of Delaware alumni
United States Army colonels
20th-century Methodists